Shebaba is an album by Brazilian guitarist Bola Sete, released in 1971 through Fantasy Records. It was his final album for Fastasy and has yet to be issued on CD.

Track listing
All tracks composed by Bola Sete; except where noted.

Release history

Personnel 
Ed Bogas – violin
Hadley Caliman – tenor saxophone
Dwight Dickerson – keyboards
Luis Gasca – trumpet, flugelhorn
Terrance Laine – congas, percussion
Jose Marino – bass guitar, percussion
Ronald Mesquita – drums, percussion
Larry Patterson – backing vocals
Nathan Rubin – violin
Bola Sete – 13-string lute, electric guitar, percussion, vocals
James Wilcots – backing vocals
Josef Williams – backing vocals
Lenny Williams – vocals
Technical
Pete Turner - front cover photography

References 

1971 albums
Bola Sete albums
Fantasy Records albums